Evgenia Filonenko (born 12 August 1982) is a Ukrainian former pair skater. She competed with Igor Marchenko and Aleksandr Chestnikh. With Marchenko, she placed 11th at the 1998 Winter Olympics. They won two medals at the World Junior Figure Skating Championships, a silver in 1996 and a bronze in 1995. They are the 1998 Ukrainian national champions.

After her partnership with Marchenko dissolved, Filonenko paired up with Aleksandr Chestnikh to skate for Georgia. They competed at the 2000 World Figure Skating Championships and European Figure Skating Championships, placing 16th both times.

She is the first cousin of Julia Obertas.

Results
(with Marchenko)

References

 Skatabase: Junior Worlds
 Skatabase: 1998 Olympics

External links
 Pairs on Ice: Evgeni Filonenko / Igor Marchenko
 Pairs on Ice: Evgenia Filonenko / Aleksandr Chestnikh

Ukrainian female pair skaters
Female pair skaters from Georgia (country)
Olympic figure skaters of Ukraine
Figure skaters at the 1998 Winter Olympics
1982 births
Living people
World Junior Figure Skating Championships medalists
Sportspeople from Dnipro